In continuum mechanics,  Lamé parameters (also called the Lamé coefficients, Lamé constants or Lamé moduli) are two material-dependent quantities denoted by λ and μ that arise in strain-stress relationships. In general, λ and μ are individually referred to as Lamé's first parameter and Lamé's second parameter, respectively. Other names are sometimes employed for one or both parameters, depending on context. For example, the parameter μ is referred to in fluid dynamics as the dynamic viscosity of a fluid(not the same units); whereas in the context of elasticity, μ is called the shear modulus, and is sometimes denoted by G instead of μ. Typically the notation G is seen paired with the use of Young's modulus E, and the notation μ is paired with the use of λ.

In homogeneous and isotropic materials, these define Hooke's law in 3D,  where  is the stress tensor,  the strain tensor,  the identity matrix and  the trace function. Hooke's law may be written in terms of tensor components using index notation as  where  is the Kronecker delta.

Relations for other moduli are found in the (λ, G) row of the 
conversions table at the end of this article.

Although the shear modulus, μ, must be positive, the Lamé's first parameter, λ, can be negative, in principle; however, for most materials it is also positive.

The parameters are named after Gabriel Lamé. They have the same dimension as stress and are usually given in SI unit of stress [Pa].

See also 
Elasticity tensor

Further reading 
 K. Feng, Z.-C. Shi, Mathematical Theory of Elastic Structures, Springer New York, (1981)
 G. Mavko, T. Mukerji, J. Dvorkin, The Rock Physics Handbook, Cambridge University Press (paperback), (2003)
 W.S. Slaughter, The Linearized Theory of Elasticity, Birkhäuser, (2002)

References

Elasticity (physics)